The 153d Airlift Wing (153d AW) is a unit of the Wyoming Air National Guard, stationed at Cheyenne Air National Guard Base, Wyoming. If activated to federal service, the Wing is gained by the United States Air Force Air Mobility Command.

Overview
The 153rd Airlift Wing's C-130 Hercules mission is to perform the tactical portion of the airlift mission. The aircraft is capable of operating from rough, dirt strips and is the prime transport for air dropping troops and equipment into hostile areas. The C-130 performs a diverse number of roles, including airlift support, Antarctic ice resupply, aeromedical missions, weather reconnaissance, aerial spray missions, firefighting duties for the U.S. Forest Service and natural disaster relief missions.

Units
The 153d Airlift Wing consists of the following units:
 153rd Operations Group
 187th Airlift Squadron
 187th Operations Support Squadron
 187th Aeromedical Evacuation Squadron
 243rd Air Traffic Control Squadron
 153rd Maintenance Group
 153rd Maintenance Squadron
 153rd Aircraft Maintenance Squadron
 153rd Maintenance Operations Flight
 153rd Mission Support Group
 153rd Civil Engineer Squadron
 153rd Command and Control Squadron
 153rd Communications Flight
 153rd Force Support Squadron
 153rd Logistics Readiness Squadron
 153rd Security Forces Squadron
 153rd Medical Group

History
On 1 July 1957, the Wyoming Air National Guard 187th Fighter-Interceptor Squadron was authorized to expand to a group level, and the 153d Fighter Group (Air Defense) was established by the National Guard Bureau. The 187th FIS becoming the group's flying squadron. Other squadrons assigned into the group were the 153d Headquarters, 153d Material Squadron (Maintenance), 153d Combat Support Squadron, and the 153d USAF Dispensary.   The 153d FIG being assigned to the 34th Air Division, Air Defense Command and upgraded to F-86L Sabre Interceptors.

Airlift mission

The most dramatic change came for the Wyoming unit in 1961 when it changed from an Air Defense Command Fighter-Interceptor unit to flying C-119 Flying Boxcars and airlifting medical patients, with the newly designated 187th Aeromedical Transport Squadron becoming part of Military Air Transport Service (MATS).

On 21 June 1963 the 187th received C-121 Super Constellation aircraft and expanded its military airlift role to worldwide mission capabilities. Entering the realm of Southeast Asia and the Vietnam War, the Wyoming Air Guard flew its first mission into the Southeast Asia theater combat zone in late 1964, and continued to do so throughout the Vietnam War years. In January 1966, the unit became the 153d Military Airlift Group [153d MAG], under the Military Airlift Command [MAC].

In 1972, the 187th received its first turboprop C-130B Hercules aircraft, and became a Tactical Airlift Squadron.  The C-130 has proven to be one of the toughest and most versatile aircraft ever built, and which the unit continues to fly over 40 years later. In 1975, the Wyoming Air Guard was selected for the unique role of aerial fire fighting. Two Wyoming C-130s were equipped with Modular Airborne FireFighting System (MAFFS) and began water/fire retardant bombing of fires throughout the United States. Those fire fighting mission still continue through the present.

In the meantime, the 153d Tactical Airlift Group expanded to regularly flying missions with the US Southern Command out of Howard AFB, Panama, as part of Operation Phoenix Oak. From supplying embassies in Central and South America, to searching for sinking ships in the middle of tropical storms, the Wyoming C-130s and aircrews have carried out military and humanitarian missions, right up to the present day. Those missions continued through Operation Just Cause in 1989-90 when Panama was designated a combat zone.

Beginning 5 August 1990, the first day of Operation Desert Shield, and into Operation Desert Storm the Wyoming Air Guard flew continental U.S. and Central and South America missions. During that time, the Wyoming 187th Aeromedical Evacuation Flight and the 153d Clinic were both activated by order of the President of the United States, with a large number of those medical personnel being sent to Saudi Arabia. After the hostilities, Wyoming Guard members continued with Operation Provide Comfort, which supplied humanitarian aid to Kurdish people displaced by the Iraqi military.

In April 1997 the Wyoming 153d Airlift Wing was reassigned to the Air Mobility Command [AMC], and continued its federal and state airlift, fire fighting, and humanitarian missions. From 10 November – 5 December 1997, the Wyoming Air National Guard flew 250 airborne fire-fighting missions in the jungles of Indonesia as Operation Thrust Rapid, No. 1. This was the first time U.S. airborne fire fighting had ever been done outside of the continental U.S.

Global War on Terrorism

As with the rest of the U.S. military, the wing's focus changed abruptly on 11 September 2001. Responding immediately, the 153 AW became the first unit to resume flying, by answering the call to ferry blood donations around the western United States. By the end of September virtually all of the 153rd Security Forces Squadron had been called to active duty and assigned to active Air Force bases. As a result, numerous individuals volunteered to be activated as security forces augmentees, an assignment that lasted half a year for many. Three others volunteered for temporary civilian airport security duties.

As the Global War on Terrorism expanded to include operations in Iraq and continued operations in Afghanistan, the 153rd Airlift Wing repeatedly answered the nations call. In addition to its ongoing commitment to MAFFS, Operation Joint Forge in Europe, and Coronet Oak in Latin America, the 153 AW maintained a two-year-long, two-aircraft commitment to Operation Iraqi Freedom during 2004–2005.

In 2006 and 2007 the unit returned to Afghanistan for two and three aircraft Aerospace Expeditionary Force rotations. On the home front, the end of 2007 found four aircraft responding to the great 2007 California wildfires.

In Cheyenne the period 2004-2007 witnessed the 153 AW receiving a remodeled dining facility, a new Petroleum Oils and Lubricants [POL] facility, a new air operations building for Air Traffic Control and Aerial Port, and approval of a new squadrons operations building. Numerous temporary modular buildings also supported the unit.

The time period 2006-2007 also witnessed a unique combination of active duty and National Guard forces in Cheyenne. In July 2006 the 30th Airlift Squadron, an active duty unit, stood up in Cheyenne, under the operational direction of the 153 AW. Known as an active associate unit, the addition of the 30 AS resulted in the 153 AW receiving an additional four C-130 aircraft during 2007, and increased the wing's aircraft strength from eight to twelve aircraft.

Lineage
 Designated 153d Fighter Group (Air Defense), and allotted to Wyoming ANG, 1957
 Extended federal recognition and activated, 1 July 1957
 Re-designated: 153d Aeromedical Transport Group, 1 May 1961
 Re-designated: 153d Air Transport Group, 8 Feb 1964
 Re-designated: 153d Military Airlift Group, 8 Jan 1966
 Re-designated: 153d Tactical Airlift Group, 13 Jul 1972
 Re-designated: 153d Airlift Group, 15 Mar 1992
 Status changed from Group to Wing, 1 October 1995
 Re-designated: 153d Airlift Wing, 1 October 1995

Assignments
 140th Air Defense Wing, 1 Jul 1957
 Wyoming Air National Guard, 1 January 1961
 Gained by: 34th Air Division, Air Defense Command
 Gained by: Western Transport Air Force, (WESTAF), Military Air Transport Service, 1 May 1961
 Gained by: Twenty-Second Air Force, Military Airlift Command, 8 January 1966
 Gained by: Air Combat Command, 1 June 1992
 Gained by: Air Mobility Command, 1 June 1993 – present

Components
 153d Operations Group, 1 October 1995 – Present
 187th Fighter-Interceptor (later Aeromedical Transport, Air Transport, Military Airlift, Tactical Airlift, Airlift) Squadron, 1 July 1957 – 1 October 1995
 Assigned to 153d OS 1 October 1995 – present
 30th Airlift Squadron, 1 July 2006 – Present
 Assigned to 153d OS 1 October 2006 – present

Stations
 Cheyenne Municipal Airport, Wyoming, 1 July 1957
 Designated: Cheyenne Air National Guard Base, Wyoming, 1991 – present

Aircraft

 F-86L Sabre Interceptor, 1957-1961
 C/MC-119J Flying Boxcar, 1961-1963
 C-121G Constellation, 1963-1972

 C-130B Hercules, 1972-1994
 C-130H Hercules, 1993 – present

References

 Rogers, B. (2006). United States Air Force Unit Designations Since 1978. 
  Cornett, Lloyd H. and Johnson, Mildred W., A Handbook of Aerospace Defense Organization  1946 - 1980, Office of History, Aerospace Defense Center, Peterson AFB, CO (1980).
 153d Airlift Wing (official website)
 http://www.globalsecurity.org/military/agency/usaf/153aw.htm

Wings of the United States Air National Guard
Military units and formations in Wyoming
Cheyenne, Wyoming
0153